The men's 10000 metres at the 2014 World Junior Championships in Athletics was held at Hayward Field on 22 July.

Medalists

Records

Results

References

External links
 WJC14 10000 metres results

10000 metres
Long distance running at the World Athletics U20 Championships